{{Infobox martial artist
| name            = Kim Dong-hyun
| native_name     = 김동현金東炫
| other_names     = Stun GunMemi(Cicada) 
| image           = Kim Dong-Hyun (fighter) from acrofan.jpg
| image_size      = 
| alt             =
| caption         = Kim in November 2012
| birth_name      = Kim Bong
| birth_date      = 
| birth_place     = Suwon, South Korea
| death_date      = 
| death_place     =
| death_cause     =
| residence       = Seoul, South Korea
| nationality     = South Korean
| height          = 6 ft 1 in
| weight_lb       = 170
| weight_class    = Welterweight (2007–2017)Lightweight (2004–2007)
| reach           = 76 in
| style           = Judo, Hapkido, Taekwondo, Brazilian Jiu-Jitsu, Wrestling, Boxing
| stance          = Southpaw
| fighting_out_of = Busan, South Korea
| team            = Busan Team MAD
| rank            =  4th Dan Black Belt in Judo 3rd Dan Black Belt in Taekwondo Brown Belt in Brazilian Jiu-Jitsu
| years_active    = 2004–2017
| mma_kowin       = 9
| mma_subwin      = 2
| mma_decwin      = 11
| mma_koloss      = 3
| mma_subloss     =
| mma_decloss     = 1
| mma_draw        = 1
| mma_nc          = 1
| url             = 
| sherdog         = 16374
| footnotes       =
| updated         =
|children=2|spouse=}}

Kim Dong-hyun (born November 17, 1981), anglicized as Dong Hyun Kim, is a retired South Korean mixed martial artist who most notably fought in the UFC's welterweight division. He was signed by the UFC after fighting in the Japanese promotion DEEP and in the South Korean promotion Spirit MC.

Kim is also prominent as a regular cast member in variety shows Master in the House and DoReMi Market.Early life
He was born in Suwon, Gyeonggi-do, and moved to Daejeon when he was a primary school student, where he was an inline speed skater. He began training in Judo when he was 14 years old, and trained in Taekwondo and Hapkido together in his late teens for his interest in martial arts. And later Kim began to practice Judo professionally at Yong-In University, which led him to reignite his MMA career. Kim began training at Wajyutsu Keisyukai, a renowned Japanese gym frequented by a number of top Japanese fighters. As one of the largest members of the gym, Kim became a regular sparring partner of middleweight Yushin Okami. At this time he competed in Judo and Sambo. He served in the Republic of Korea Marine Corps in 2001 for his mandatory service. Later he became a fighter for Spirit MC, but declared his retirement in 2004 due to economic reasons. He mentioned during Law of the Jungle that before spending four months in Auckland, New Zealand working in 3 concurrent part-time roles (kitchenhand and sashimi chef/poissonnier, bricklayer and construction labourer). His job situation never improved upon returning to Korea, until his parents finally allowed him to train again. He trains with Busan Team MAD since 2007. He teaches self defence classes. One of his students include Hani of Korean girl group EXID.

Career
Filmography
He is also a regular guest in Korean variety shows and talk shows. He has attended more than seventy TV shows since 2010. On June 16, 2013, he featured as the 'Hulk' on Running Man episode 150 (SBS Sunday night show). On this episode he led the character that transformed to Hulk mode in Running Man Avengers. On March 22, 2015, Kim reappeared on Running Man in episode 239 as a guest. Kim was also featured along with fellow UFC fighter Yoshihiro Akiyama in the Korean boy band MYNAME's drama music video for their single "Baby I'm Sorry". On June 26, 2016, Kim returned as a guest on Running Man in episode 305. Kim is regular cast member of Great Escape Season 1 of 2018 and Season 2 of 2019. In 2019, he guest-starred on Not the Person You Used To Know, where he appeared as one of the friends of Hani of EXID.

In September, 2018, he announced his marriage to Song Ha-ryul in various variety shows, then revealed her pregnancy on February 14, 2019 episode of Amazing Saturday.

Early career
Kim gained recognition after signing with the Japanese DEEP organization, earning a succession of wins before knocking out DEEP welterweight champion Hidehiko Hasegawa in a non-title bout in 2007. Kim and Hasegawa later fought to a controversial draw in a title fight at DEEP 32nd Impact, leaving defending champion Hasegawa with the title. Kim departed from DEEP to sign a contract with PRIDE Fighting Championships, but the UFC purchased and dismantled PRIDE before Kim could fight in the organization. Kim's performances attracted the attention of World Extreme Cagefighting (WEC) talent scouts, who offered him a contract. However, because the WEC is not televised in Korea, Kim's management pushed for and received a contract with the Ultimate Fighting Championship (UFC), which airs on Korean cable television.

Kim's original nickname is "Stun Gun", then a lot of Korean fans started calling him "Maemi", which means Cicada in Korean. The nickname was given to Kim from his fighting style where he likes to take his opponents to the ground, grapple with them and never let them escape like a Cicada on a tree.

Ultimate Fighting Championship
Kim made his UFC debut at UFC 84 against Jason Tan, methodically breaking down his opponent and ultimately winning by technical knockout in the third round. With his performance, Kim became the first Korean to win in the octagon. Kim's appearance drew considerable attention in Korea. One week before the event, a prime time, hour-long special about Kim was aired on Korean television. Though Kim's bout did not air on the UFC pay-per-view, it aired live on Korean television, and was then replayed twice more before the regular event coverage resumed.

He made his second octagon appearance at UFC 88, capturing a split decision over The Ultimate Fighter 7 alumnus Matt Brown. During this fight, Kim's conditioning was very poor due to jet lag, and visa problems prevented him from bringing a coach. In the first round, Kim threatened Brown with a standing rear-naked choke and took Brown's back on numerous occasions but became exhausted in the second. In the third, Kim used some effective ground-and-pound and cut Brown with an elbow. All three judges scored the bout 29–28, two in Kim's favor and one in Brown's favor. The decision was contested by the crowd in attendance with noticeable booing.

Kim returned to the octagon in Las Vegas, Nevada, on January 31, 2009, as he faced off against fellow judo practitioner Karo Parisyan at UFC 94. With Frank Mir in his corner who served as his boxing coach prior to the fight. Kim originally lost to Parisyan via split decision. Fans in attendance booed the decision, and former UFC champions Matt Hughes, Randy Couture and UFC president Dana White have commented that they thought Kim had won the fight. Afterwards, however, Parisyan tested positive for three banned pain killers: Hydrocodone, Hydromorphone and Oxymorphone. The Nevada Athletic Commission declared the match a No Contest, and Parisyan was suspended for nine months. Later on March 5, 2009, Kim signed a four fight extension with the UFC.

Kim defeated T. J. Grant at UFC 100, winning by a unanimous decision, threatening with a guillotine choke midway through the second round. He was scheduled to fight Dan Hardy on November 14, 2009, at UFC 105, but was forced to withdraw due to ligament injuries of his right knee while sparring with Kazuhiro Nakamura and was subsequently replaced on the card by Mike Swick.

Kim was expected to face Chris Lytle on February 21, 2010, at UFC 110. However, Kim was forced off the card after suffering knee injury again. Brian Foster stepped in as his replacement.

Kim next faced The Ultimate Fighter season 7 winner, Amir Sadollah on May 29, 2010, at UFC 114 and won via unanimous decision, dominating Sadollah with far superior judo.

Kim was then expected to face fellow undefeated fighter John Hathaway at UFC 120, though he was later replaced by Mike Pyle due to elbow ligament injury from training.

Kim defeated The Ultimate Fighter season 5 winner, Nate Diaz on January 1, 2011, at UFC 125 via unanimous decision. Kim used his judo to control rounds 1 and 2. Diaz mounted a remarkable offense in Round 3, but it was not enough and Kim won a decision over Diaz. After the fight Kim called out current UFC welterweight champion, Georges St-Pierre, whom he considers a hero and role model to himself as a mixed martial artist. Later on January 10, 2011, Kim signed a four fight extension with the UFC.

Kim lost to Carlos Condit on July 2, 2011, at UFC 132 via first-round KO due to a flying knee. This loss was the first of his professional MMA career.

Kim fought Sean Pierson on December 30, 2011, at UFC 141. Kim used superior striking to control Pierson throughout the fight and win a unanimous decision, even landing a leaping front-kick to the face in the second round that wobbled Pierson.

Kim lost to Demian Maia via TKO on July 7, 2012, at UFC 148. The bout was stopped in forty-seven seconds in the first round by referee Mario Yamasaki, after Maia took Kim down and ended up in the mounted position. Many observers, including the UFC commentator Joe Rogan, thought that Kim had broken a rib during the bout, but it was later revealed that he suffered a major muscle spasm while defending Maia's takedown attempts.

Kim faced Paulo Thiago on November 10, 2012, at UFC on Fuel TV 6. He dominated Thiago on the ground for all three rounds, ending the bout with a wild display of ground and pound reminiscent of Kazushi Sakuraba. He won via unanimous decision (30–26, 30–27, and 30–27).

Kim fought Siyar Bahadurzada on March 3, 2013, at UFC on Fuel TV 8. He earned a unanimous decision victory.

Kim then faced Erick Silva on October 9, 2013, at UFC Fight Night 29. He won via knockout at 3:01 of the second round, earning him his first Knockout of the Night bonus award. Later on October 30, 2013, Kim signed a four fight extension with the UFC.

Kim faced John Hathaway on March 1, 2014, at The Ultimate Fighter: China Finale. Kim defeated Hathaway via third-round knockout, earning him his first Performance of the Night'' honors.

Kim was expected to face Hector Lombard on August 23, 2014, at UFC Fight Night 48. However, Lombard pulled out of the bout and was replaced by Tyron Woodley. Kim lost the fight via TKO in the first round.

Kim faced Josh Burkman on May 23, 2015, at UFC 187.  Kim won the fight via submission in the third round.

Kim was expected to face Jorge Masvidal on November 28, 2015 at UFC Fight Night 79. However, on November 14, it was announced that Masvidal would instead face Benson Henderson at the event after his scheduled opponent Thiago Alves pulled out of their fight. Kim instead faced Dominic Waters. Kim won the fight via technical knockout in the first round.

Kim was expected to face Neil Magny on August 20, 2016, at UFC 202. However, Kim was removed from the fight on July 12 and was replaced by Lorenz Larkin.

Kim was expected to face Gunnar Nelson on November 19, 2016, at UFC Fight Night 99. However, on October 21, it was announced that Nelson pulled out due to an injury and the fight was off. In turn, Kim was removed from the card and will be rescheduled for a future event.

Kim faced Tarec Saffiedine on December 30, 2016, at UFC 207. Kim was awarded a split decision victory.

Kim faced Colby Covington on June 17, 2017, at UFC Fight Night 111. He lost the fight by unanimous decision.

Since the time of his last fight, Kim retired from MMA.

Championships and achievements

Mixed martial arts

UFC
Knockout of the Year (2014)　vs. John Hathaway 
First spinning elbow knockout in UFC history　vs. John Hathaway
Performance of the Night (One time)　vs. John Hathaway
Knockout of the Night (One time)　vs. Erick Silva
World MMA Awards
 Knockout of the Year (2014) nomination　vs. John Hathaway 
Bleacher Report
Knockout of the Year (2014)　vs. John Hathaway 
5 Best Foreign UFC Fighters #4  　the other 4 fighters: Alexander GustafssonKhabib Nurmagomedov, Conor McGregor, Rory MacDonald
Tapology
MMA's Best Knockouts of the Year (2014)　vs. John Hathaway 
The Greatest MMA Knockouts of All Time #83　vs. John Hathaway 
MMA's Best Fights of the Year #19 (2014)　vs. John Hathaway 
MMA's Best Knockouts of the Year #20 (2013)　vs. Erick Silva 
MMA's Best Fights of the Year #44 (2011)　vs. Nate Diaz 
Fox Sports
Knockout of the Year (2014)　vs. John Hathaway 

MMA Junkie
Knockout of the Year (2014)　vs. John Hathaway 
Knockout of the Month (2014 March)　vs. John Hathaway 
Knockout of the Year #3 (2013)　vs. Erick Silva 
Sherdog
Knockout of the Year (2014)　vs. John Hathaway 
MMA Mania
Knockout of the Year (2014)　vs. John Hathaway 
LowKick MMA
Knockout of the Year (2014)　vs. John Hathaway 
MMA Fighting
Knockout of the Year #2 (2014)　vs. John Hathaway 
Bloody Elbow
Knockout of the Year #2 (2014)　vs. John Hathaway 
Sports Net
Knockout of the Year #3 (2014)　vs. John Hathaway 
Knockout of the Year #7 (2013)　vs. Erick Silva

Grappling
 2013 ADCC Korea 88 kg: 1st place

Entertainment
 2018 6th Korean Art And Cultural Awards - Sportainer 
 2019 Korea First Brand Awards - Sportainer 
 2020 Brand Of The Year Awards - Sportainer 
 2020 2020 SBS Entertainment Awards - Excellence Award in Show/Variety Category

Filmography

Television shows

Mixed martial arts record

|-
|Loss
|align=center|22–4–1 (1)
|Colby Covington
|Decision (unanimous)
|UFC Fight Night: Holm vs. Correia
|
|align=center|3
|align=center|5:00
|Kallang, Singapore
|
|-
|Win
|align=center|22–3–1 (1)
|Tarec Saffiedine
|Decision (split)
|UFC 207
|
|align=center|3
|align=center|5:00
|Las Vegas, Nevada, United States
| 
|-
|Win
|align=center|21–3–1 (1)
|Dominic Waters
|TKO (punches)
|UFC Fight Night: Henderson vs. Masvidal
|
|align=center|1
|align=center|3:11
|Seoul, South Korea
|   
|-
|Win
|align=center|20–3–1 (1)
|Joshua Burkman
|Submission (arm-triangle choke)
|UFC 187
|
|align=center|3
|align=center|2:13
|Las Vegas, Nevada, United States
|
|-
| Loss
| align=center| 19–3–1 (1)
| Tyron Woodley
| TKO (punches)
| UFC Fight Night: Bisping vs. Le
| 
| align=center| 1
| align=center| 1:01
| Macau, SAR, China
| 
|-
| Win
| align=center| 19–2–1 (1) 
| John Hathaway
| KO (spinning elbow)
| The Ultimate Fighter China Finale: Kim vs. Hathaway
| 
| align=center| 3
| align=center| 1:02
| Macau, SAR, China
| 
|-
| Win
| align=center| 18–2–1 (1)
| Erick Silva
| KO (punch)
| UFC Fight Night: Maia vs. Shields
| 
| align=center| 2
| align=center| 3:01
| Barueri, Brazil
| 
|-
| Win
| align=center| 17–2–1 (1)
| Siyar Bahadurzada
| Decision (unanimous)
| UFC on Fuel TV: Silva vs. Stann
| 
| align=center| 3
| align=center| 5:00
| Saitama, Japan
| 
|-
| Win
| align=center| 16–2–1 (1)
| Paulo Thiago
| Decision (unanimous)
| UFC on Fuel TV: Franklin vs. Le
| 
| align=center| 3
| align=center| 5:00
| Macau, SAR, China
| 
|-
| Loss
| align=center| 15–2–1 (1)
| Demian Maia
| TKO (rib injury)
| UFC 148
| 
| align=center| 1
| align=center| 0:47
| Las Vegas, Nevada, United States
| 
|-
| Win
| align=center| 15–1–1 (1)
| Sean Pierson
| Decision (unanimous)
| UFC 141
| 
| align=center| 3
| align=center| 5:00
| Las Vegas, Nevada, United States
| 
|-
| Loss
| align=center| 14–1–1 (1)
| Carlos Condit
| KO (flying knee and punches)
| UFC 132
| 
| align=center| 1
| align=center| 2:58
| Las Vegas, Nevada, United States
| 
|-
| Win
| align=center| 14–0–1 (1)
| Nate Diaz
| Decision (unanimous)
| UFC 125
| 
| align=center| 3
| align=center| 5:00
| Las Vegas, Nevada, United States
| 
|-
| Win
| align=center| 13–0–1 (1)
| Amir Sadollah
| Decision (unanimous)
| UFC 114
| 
| align=center| 3
| align=center| 5:00
| Las Vegas, Nevada, United States
| 
|-
| Win
| align=center| 12–0–1 (1)
| T. J. Grant
| Decision (unanimous)
| UFC 100
| 
| align=center| 3
| align=center| 5:00
| Las Vegas, Nevada, United States
| 
|-
| NC
| align=center| 11–0–1 (1)
| Karo Parisyan
| NC (overturned)
| UFC 94
| 
| align=center| 3
| align=center| 5:00
| Las Vegas, Nevada, United States
| 
|-
| Win
| align=center| 11–0–1
| Matt Brown
| Decision (split)
| UFC 88
| 
| align=center| 3
| align=center| 5:00
| Atlanta, Georgia, United States
| 
|-
| Win
| align=center| 10–0–1
| Jason Tan
| TKO (elbows)
| UFC 84
| 
| align=center| 3
| align=center| 0:25
| Las Vegas, Nevada, United States
| 
|-
| Draw
| align=center| 9–0–1
| Hidehiko Hasegawa
| Draw
| Deep: 32 Impact
| 
| align=center| 3
| align=center| 5:00
| Tokyo, Japan
| 
|-
| Win
| align=center| 9–0
| Hidehiko Hasegawa
| KO (slam and punches)
| Deep: 31 Impact
| 
| align=center| 3
| align=center| 4:57
| Tokyo, Japan
|
|-
| Win
| align=center| 8–0
| Yukiharu Maejima
| KO (punches)
| Deep: CMA Festival 2
| 
| align=center| 1
| align=center| 0:11
| Tokyo, Japan
| 
|-
| Win
| align=center| 7–0
| Hidenobu Koike
| KO (punch)
| Deep: 28 Impact
| 
| align=center| 2
| align=center| 4:33
| Tokyo, Japan
| 
|-
| Win
| align=center| 6–0
| Jun Ando
| TKO (punches)
| Deep: 27 Impact
| 
| align=center| 2
| align=center| 0:44
| Tokyo, Japan
| 
|-
| Win
| align=center| 5–0
| Kousei Kubota
| KO (knee)
| Deep: 26 Impact
| 
| align=center| 1
| align=center| 2:46
| Tokyo, Japan
| 
|-
| Win
| align=center| 4–0
| Tomoyoshi Iwamiya
| Decision (unanimous)
| Deep: 25 Impact
| 
| align=center| 2
| align=center| 5:00
| Tokyo, Japan
| 
|-
| Win
| align=center| 3–0
| Mitsunori Tanimura
| Submission (rear-naked choke)
| Deep: CMA Festival
| 
| align=center| 1
| align=center| 4:28
| Tokyo, Japan
| 
|-
| Win
| align=center| 2–0
| Hyung-Kwang Kim
| Decision (unanimous)
| Spirit MC 5: 2004 GP Unlimited
| 
| align=center| 3
| align=center| 5:00
| Seoul, South Korea
| 
|-
| Win
| align=center| 1–0
| Young-Ahm Noh
| Decision (unanimous)
| Spirit MC 3: I Will Be Back!!!
| 
| align=center| 3
| align=center| 5:00
| Seoul, South Korea
|

See also
 List of male mixed martial artists

References

External links
Official UFC Profile

Instagram
YouTube: Memi Kim TV
BONBOO Entertainment

1981 births
Living people
South Korean hapkido practitioners
South Korean male mixed martial artists
South Korean male taekwondo practitioners
Welterweight mixed martial artists
Republic of Korea Marine Corps personnel
Yong In University alumni
Wajitsu Keishukai
South Korean practitioners of Brazilian jiu-jitsu
South Korean male judoka
South Korean sambo practitioners
People from Suwon
Ultimate Fighting Championship male fighters
Mixed martial artists utilizing taekwondo
Mixed martial artists utilizing judo
Mixed martial artists utilizing hapkido
Mixed martial artists utilizing wrestling
South Korean television personalities
Sportspeople from Gyeonggi Province